The 2009 season is Adelaide United Women's second season in the W-League.

Review

September
This season saw drastic squad changes after a disappointing inaugural season, including new signing Christina Papageorgiou taking the captaincy. However, Adelaide still struggled in the league failing to win a single game, and finished seventh ahead of the Newcastle Jets.

March
Racheal Quigley was named Adelaide United 2009/10 Westfield W-League Most Valuable Player.

Players

Transfers

In

Out

Squad statistics

Appearances and goals

1Short-term injury cover

Competitions

W-League

League table

Results by matchday

Matches

References

External links
 Official club website

2009
Adelaide United